Barreiras do Piauí is a municipality in the state of Piauí in the Northeast region of Brazil.

The municipality contains part of the  Nascentes do Rio Parnaíba National Park, created in 2002.

See also
List of municipalities in Piauí

References

Municipalities in Piauí